The Fabian Society is a British socialist organisation whose purpose is to advance the principles of social democracy and democratic socialism via gradualist and reformist effort in democracies, rather than by revolutionary overthrow. The Fabian Society was also historically related to radicalism, a left-wing liberal tradition.

As one of the founding organisations of the Labour Representation Committee in 1900, and as an important influence upon the Labour Party which grew from it, the Fabian Society has had a powerful influence on British politics. Members of the Fabian Society have included political leaders from other countries, such as Jawaharlal Nehru, who adopted Fabian principles as part of their own political ideologies. The Fabian Society founded the London School of Economics in 1895.

Today, the society functions primarily as a think tank and is one of twenty socialist societies affiliated with the Labour Party. Similar societies exist in Australia, in Canada, in New Zealand, in Sicily.

Organisational history

Establishment

The Fabian Society was founded on 4 January 1884 in London as an offshoot of a society founded a year earlier, called The Fellowship of the New Life, which had been a forebear of the British Ethical and humanist movements.  Early Fellowship members included  the visionary Victorian elite, among them poets Edward Carpenter and John Davidson, sexologist Havelock Ellis, and early socialist Edward R. Pease. They wanted to transform society by setting an example of clean simplified living for others to follow. Some members also wanted to become politically involved to aid society's transformation; they set up a separate society, the Fabian Society. All members were free to attend both societies. The Fabian Society additionally advocated renewal of Western European Renaissance ideas and their promulgation throughout the world.

The Fellowship of the New Life was dissolved in 1899, but the Fabian Society grew to become a leading academic society in the United Kingdom in the Edwardian era. It was typified by the members of its vanguard Coefficients club. Public meetings of the Society were for many years held at Essex Hall, a popular location just off the Strand in central London.

The Fabian Society was named—at the suggestion of Frank Podmore—in honour of the Roman general Quintus Fabius Maximus Verrucosus (nicknamed Cunctator, meaning the "Delayer"). His Fabian strategy sought gradual victory against the superior Carthaginian army under the renowned general Hannibal through persistence, harassment, and wearing the enemy down by attrition rather than pitched, climactic battles.

An explanatory note appearing on the title page of the group's first pamphlet declared:For the right moment you must wait, as Fabius did most patiently when warring against Hannibal, though many censured his delays; but when the time comes you must strike hard, as Fabius did, or your waiting will be in vain, and fruitless.

According to author Jon Perdue, "The logo of the Fabian Society, a tortoise, represented the group's predilection for a slow, imperceptible transition to socialism, while its coat of arms, a 'wolf in sheep's clothing', represented its preferred methodology for achieving its goal." The wolf in sheep's clothing symbolism was later abandoned, due to its obvious negative connotations.

Its nine founding members were Frank Podmore, Edward R. Pease, William Clarke, Hubert Bland, Percival Chubb, Frederick Keddell, H. H. Champion, Edith Nesbit, and Rosamund Dale Owen. Havelock Ellis is sometimes also mentioned as a tenth founding member, though there is some question about this.

Organisational growth
Immediately upon its inception, the Fabian Society began attracting many prominent contemporary figures drawn to its socialist cause, including George Bernard Shaw, H. G. Wells, Annie Besant, Graham Wallas, Charles Marson, Sydney Olivier, Oliver Lodge, Ramsay MacDonald and Emmeline Pankhurst. Bertrand Russell briefly became a member, but resigned after he expressed his belief that the Society's principle of entente (in this case, between countries allying themselves against Germany) could lead to war.

At the core of the Fabian Society were Sidney and Beatrice Webb. Together, they wrote numerous studies of industrial Britain, including alternative co-operative economics that applied to ownership of capital as well as land.

Many Fabians participated in the formation of the Labour Representation Committee in 1900 and the group's constitution, written by Sidney Webb, borrowed heavily from the founding documents of the Fabian Society. At the meeting that founded the Labour Representation Committee in 1900, the Fabian Society claimed 861 members and sent one delegate.

The years 1903 to 1908 saw a growth in popular interest in the socialist idea in Great Britain and the Fabian Society grew accordingly, tripling its membership to nearly 2500 by the end of the period, half of whom were located in London. In 1912, a student section was organised called the University Socialist Federation (USF) and by the outbreak of World War I in 1914 this contingent counted its own membership of more than 500.

Early Fabian views
The first Fabian Society pamphlets advocating tenets of social justice coincided with the zeitgeist of Liberal reforms during the early 1900s, including eugenics. The Fabian proposals however were considerably more progressive than those that were enacted in the Liberal reform legislation. The Fabians lobbied for the introduction of a minimum wage in 1906, for the creation of a universal health care system in 1911 and for the abolition of hereditary peerages in 1917. Agnes Harben and Henry Devenish Harben were among Fabians advocating women's emancipation and supporting suffrage movements in Britain, and internationally.

Fabian socialists were in favour of reforming the foreign policy of the British Empire as a conduit for internationalist reform, and were in favour of a capitalist welfare state modelled on the Bismarckian German model; they criticised Gladstonian liberalism both for its individualism at home and its internationalism abroad. They favoured a national minimum wage in order to stop British industries compensating for their inefficiency by lowering wages instead of investing in capital equipment; slum clearances and a health service in order for "the breeding of even a moderately Imperial race" which would be more productive and better militarily than the "stunted, anaemic, demoralised denizens ... of our great cities"; and a national education system because "it is in the classrooms ... that the future battles of the Empire for commercial prosperity are already being lost".

In 1900 the Society produced Fabianism and the Empire, the first statement of its views on foreign affairs, drafted by Bernard Shaw and incorporating the suggestions of 150 Fabian members. It was directed against the liberal individualism of those such as John Morley and Sir William Harcourt. It claimed that the classical liberal political economy was outdated and that imperialism was the new stage of the international polity. The question was whether Britain would be the centre of a world empire or whether it would lose its colonies and end up as just two islands in the North Atlantic. It expressed support for Britain in the Boer War because small nations, such as the Boers, were anachronisms in the age of empires.

In order to hold onto the Empire, the British needed to fully exploit the trade opportunities secured by war; maintain the British armed forces in a high state of readiness to defend the Empire; the creation of a citizen army to replace the professional army; the Factory Acts would be amended to extend to 21 the age for half-time employment, so that the thirty hours gained would be used in "a combination of physical exercises, technical education, education in civil citizenship ... and field training in the use of modern weapons".

The Fabians also favoured the nationalisation of land rent, believing that rents collected by landowners in respect of their land's value were unearned, an idea which drew heavily from the work of American economist Henry George.

Second generation
In the period between the two World Wars, the "Second Generation" Fabians, including the writers R. H. Tawney, G. D. H. Cole and Harold Laski, continued to be a major influence on socialist thought.

It was at this time that many of the future leaders of the Third World were exposed to Fabian thought, most notably India's Jawaharlal Nehru, who subsequently framed economic policy for India on Fabian socialism lines. After independence from Britain, Nehru's Fabian ideas committed India to an economy in which the state owned, operated and controlled means of production, in particular key heavy industrial sectors such as steel, telecommunications, transportation, electricity generation, mining and real estate development. Private activity, property rights and entrepreneurship were discouraged or regulated through permits, nationalisation of economic activity and high taxes were encouraged, rationing, control of individual choices and Mahalanobis model considered by Nehru as a means to implement the Fabian Society version of socialism. In addition to Nehru, several pre-independence leaders in colonial India such as Annie Besant—Nehru's mentor and later a president of Indian National Congress – were members of the Fabian Society.

Obafemi Awolowo, who later became the premier of Nigeria's now-defunct Western Region, was also a Fabian member in the late 1940s. It was the Fabian ideology that Awolowo used to run the Western Region during his premiership with great success, although he was prevented from using it in a similar fashion on the national level in Nigeria. It is less known that the founder of Pakistan, Muhammad Ali Jinnah, was an avid member of the Fabian Society in the early 1930s. Lee Kuan Yew, the first Prime Minister of Singapore, stated in his memoirs that his initial political philosophy was strongly influenced by the Fabian Society. However, he later altered his views, considering the Fabian ideal of socialism as impractical. In 1993, Lee said:

In the Middle East, the theories of Fabian Society intellectual movement of early 20th-century Britain inspired the Ba'athist vision. The Middle East adaptation of Fabian socialism led the state to control big industry, transport, banks, internal and external trade. The state would direct the course of economic development, with the ultimate aim to provide a guaranteed minimum standard of living for all. Michel Aflaq, widely considered as the founder of the Ba'athist movement, was a Fabian socialist. Aflaq's ideas, with those of Salah al-Din al-Bitar and Zaki al-Arsuzi, came to fruition in the Arab world in the form of dictatorial regimes in Iraq and Syria. Salāmah Mūsā of Egypt, another prominent champion of Arab Socialism, was a keen adherent of Fabian Society, and a member since 1909.

In October 1940, the Fabian Society established the Fabian Colonial Bureau to facilitate research and debate British colonial policy. The Fabian Colonial Bureau strongly influenced the colonial policies of the Attlee government (1945–51). Rita Hinden founded the colonial bureau and was its secretary.

Fabian academics of the late 20th century included the political scientist Sir Bernard Crick, the economists Thomas Balogh and Nicholas Kaldor, and the sociologist Peter Townsend.

20th century
During the 20th century the group was always influential in Labour Party circles, with members including Ramsay MacDonald, Clement Attlee, Anthony Crosland, Roy Jenkins, Hugh Dalton, Richard Crossman, Ian Mikardo, Tony Benn, Harold Wilson and more recently Shirley Williams, Tony Blair, Gordon Brown, Gordon Marsden and Ed Balls. 229 members of the Society were elected to Parliament at the 1945 general election. Ben Pimlott served as its chairman in the 1990s. (A Pimlott Prize for Political Writing was organised in his memory by the Fabian Society and The Guardian in 2005, and continues annually.) The Society is affiliated to the Party as a socialist society. In recent years the Young Fabian group, founded in 1960, has become an important networking and discussion organisation for younger (under 31) Labour Party activists and played a role in the 1994 election of Tony Blair as Labour Leader. Today there is also an active Fabian Women's Network and Scottish and Welsh Fabian groups.

Influence on Labour government
After the election of a Labour Party government in 1997, the Fabian Society was a forum for New Labour ideas and for critical approaches from across the party. The most significant Fabian contribution to Labour's policy agenda in government was Ed Balls's 1992 discussion paper, advocating Bank of England independence. Balls had been a Financial Times journalist when he wrote this Fabian pamphlet, before going to work for Gordon Brown. Former BBC Business Editor Robert Peston, in his book Brown's Britain, calls this an "essential tract" and concludes that Balls "deserves as much credit – probably more – than anyone else for the creation of the modern Bank of England"; William Keegan offered a similar analysis of Balls's Fabian pamphlet in his book on Labour's economic policy, which traces in detail the path leading up to this dramatic policy change after Labour's first week in office.

Contemporary Fabianism
On 21 April 2009 the Society's website stated that it had 6,286 members: "Fabian national membership now stands at a 35 year high: it is over 20% higher than when the Labour Party came to office in May 1997. It is now double what it was when Clement Attlee left office in 1951".

The latest edition of the Dictionary of National Biography (a reference work listing details of famous or significant Britons throughout history) includes 174 Fabians. Four Fabians, Beatrice and Sidney Webb, Graham Wallas, and George Bernard Shaw, founded the London School of Economics with the money left to the Fabian Society by Henry Hutchinson. Supposedly the decision was made at a breakfast party on 4 August 1894. The founders are depicted in the Fabian Window designed by George Bernard Shaw. The window was stolen in 1978 and reappeared at Sotheby's in 2005. It was restored to display in the Shaw Library at the London School of Economics in 2006 at a ceremony over which Tony Blair presided.

As of 2016, the Fabian Society had about 7,000 members. In June 2019 it had 7,136 individual members.

The Fabian Society Tax Commission of 2000 was widely credited with influencing the Labour government's policy and political strategy for its one significant public tax increase: the National Insurance rise to raise £8 billion for National Health Service spending. (The Fabian Commission had in fact called for a directly hypothecated "NHS tax" to cover the full cost of NHS spending, arguing that linking taxation more directly to spending was essential to make tax rise publicly acceptable. The 2001 National Insurance rise was not formally hypothecated, but the government committed itself to using the additional funds for health spending.) Several other recommendations, including a new top rate of income tax, were to the left of government policy and not accepted, though this comprehensive review of UK taxation was influential in economic policy and political circles, and a new top rate of income tax of 50% was introduced in 2010.

In early 2017, Fabian general secretary Andrew Harrop produced a report arguing the only feasible route for Labour to return to government would be to work with the Liberal Democrats and Scottish National Party. The report predicted Labour would win fewer than 150 seats in the 2017 United Kingdom general election, the lowest number since 1935, due to Brexit, lack of support in Scotland, and Labour leader Jeremy Corbyn's supposed unpopularity, although in the event the party won 262.

Fabianism outside the United Kingdom

The major influence on the Labour Party and on the English-speaking socialist movement worldwide, has meant that Fabianism became one of the main inspirations of international social democracy.

In February 1895, an American Fabian Society was established in Boston by W. D. P. Bliss, a prominent Christian socialist. The group published a periodical, The American Fabian, and issued a small series of pamphlets. Around the same time a parallel organisation emerged on the Pacific coast, centred in California, under the influence of socialist activist Laurence Gronlund. American Fabianism lasted for less than a decade.

Similar societies exist in Australia the Australian Fabian Society, in Canada the Douglas–Coldwell Foundation and the now-disbanded League for Social Reconstruction, and in New Zealand The NZ Fabian Society.

Direct or indirect Fabian influence may also be seen in the liberal socialism of Carlo Rosselli (founder, with his brother Nello, of the anti-fascist group Giustizia e Libertà) and all its derivatives such as the Action Party in Italy.
The Community Movement, created by the socialist entrepreneur Adriano Olivetti, was then the only Italian party which referred explicitly to Fabianism, among his main inspirations along with federalism, social liberalism, fighting partitocracy and social democracy.

In 2000, the Sicilian Fabian Society was founded in Messina.

Structure

It is written into the rules of the society that it has no policies.  All the publications carry a disclaimer saying that they do not represent the collective views of the society but only the views of the authors.  "No resolution of a political character expressing an opinion or calling for action, other than in relation to the running of the Society itself, shall be put forward in the name of the Society."

Executive committee
The Fabian Society is governed by an elected executive committee. The committee consists of 10 ordinary members elected from a national list, three members nationally elected from a list nominated by local groups, representatives from the Young Fabians, Fabians Women's Network and Scottish and Welsh Fabians. There is also one staff representative and a directly elected honorary treasurer from the membership. Elections are held every other year, with the exception of the Young Fabians and staff representation which are elected annually. The committee meets quarterly and elect a chair and at least one vice-chair annually to conduct its business. The current chair of the Fabian Society is Martin Edobor.

Secretariat
The Fabian Society have a number of employees based in their headquarters in London. The secretariat is led by a general secretary, who is the organisation's CEO. The staff are arranged into departments including Research, Editorial, Events and Operations.

Fabian Review
The Fabian Society has Fabian Review, a quarterly magazine.

Young Fabians

Since 1960 members aged under 31 years of age are also members of the Young Fabians. This group has its own elected Chair, executive committee and sub-groups. The Young Fabians are a voluntary organisation that serves as an incubator for member-led activities such as policy and social events, pamphlets and delegations. Within the group are five special interest communities called Networks that are run by voluntary steering groups and elect their own Chair and officers. The current Networks are Economy & Finance, Health, International Affairs, Education, Communications (Industry), Environment, Tech, Devolution & Local Government, Law, and Arts & Culture. It also publishes the quarterly magazine Anticipations.

Fabian Women's Network
All female members of the Fabian Society are also members of the Fabian Women's Network. This group has its own elected Chair and Executive Committee which organises conferences and events and works with the wider political movement to secure increased representation for women in politics and public life. It has a flagship mentoring programme that recruits on an annual basis, and its president is Seema Malhotra, a Labour Party and Co-operative MP. The Network also publishes the quarterly magazine, Fabiana, runs a range of public speaking events, works closely in partnership with a range of women's campaigning organisations and regularly hosts a fringe at the Labour Party conference.

Local Fabians
There are 45 local Fabian societies across the UK, bringing Fabian debates to communities around the country. Some, such as Bournemouth and Oxford, have long histories, dating from the 1890s, though most have waxed and waned over the years. The Fabian local societies were given a major boost during the Second World War when re-founded by G. D. H. Cole and Margaret Cole, who noted renewed interest in socialism and that wartime evacuation created chances for Fabians to strengthen influence outside London. Many local societies are affiliated to their local constituency Labour Party and have their own executive bodies. These local branches are affiliated to the national Fabians and local members have the same voting rights as their national counterparts.

Influence on the political right
When founded in 1884 as a parliamentarian organisation, there was no leftist party with which the Fabians could connect. As such, they initially attempted to 'permeate' the Liberals, with some success. The foundation of the Labour Party in 1900 signalled a change in tactics, although Fabian-Liberal links on specific topics such as welfare reform lasted well into the interwar period.

More recent studies have examined their impact on the Conservatives, such as the foundation of Ashridge College, explicitly designed in the 1930s to create Conservative Fabians.

Critiques of the Fabians
As one of the world's oldest and most prominent think tanks, the Fabians have sometimes fallen under attack, more often from the left than the right.

Most older critiques focused on the Fabians' political organisation efforts, and claims to have been influential.

Although H. G. Wells was a member of the Fabian Society from 1903 to 1908, he was a critic of its operations, particularly in his 1905 paper "The Faults of the Fabian", in which he claimed the Society was a middle-class talking shop. He later parodied the society in his 1910 novel The New Machiavelli.<ref>H. G. Wells, The New Machiavelli, Dunfield & co., New York (1910)</ref>

During the First World War, Vladimir Lenin wrote that the Fabians were "social-chauvinists", "undoubtedly the most consummate expression of opportunism and of Liberal-Labour policy". Drawing from Friedrich Engels, Lenin declared the Fabians were "a gang of bourgeois rogues who would demoralise the workers, influence them in a counter-revolutionary spirit".

In the 1920s, Leon Trotsky critiqued the Fabian Society as provincial, boring and unnecessary, particularly to the working class. He wrote that their published works "serve merely to explain to the Fabians themselves why Fabianism exists in the world".

The post-war Communist Party Historians Group was critical of the Fabians, and indeed the post-war consensus, with its strong social-democratic influence. The Marxist historian Eric Hobsbawm wrote his PhD thesis attacking claims from the early Fabians to have been originators of the Labour Party and the post-war consensus. Instead he argued that the credit should be given to the more autonomous, working-class Independent Labour Party.Evans, Richard J. Eric Hobsbawm: a life in history. Hachette UK, 2019.

In more recent years, critiques of the early Fabians have focused on other areas.

In an article published in The Guardian on 14 February 2008 (following the apology offered by Australian Prime Minister Kevin Rudd to the "stolen generations"), Geoffrey Robertson criticised Fabian socialists for providing the intellectual justification for the eugenics policy that led to the stolen generations scandal. Similar claims have been repeated in The Spectator.

In 2009, making a speech in the United States, the then British MP George Galloway denounced the Fabian Society for its failure to support the uprising of Easter 1916 in Dublin during which an Irish Republic was proclaimed.

 Funding 
The Fabian Society has been rated as "broadly transparent" in its funding by Transparify. In November 2022, the funding transparency website Who Funds You? gave the Fabian Society an A grade, the highest transparency rating (rating goes from A to E).

See also

 Ethical movement
 Keir Hardie
 Labour Research Department
 List of Fabian Tracts to 1915
 List of think tanks in the United Kingdom
 New Statesman The New AgeFootnotes

Further reading
 
 
 McKernan, James A., "The origins of critical theory in education: Fabian socialism as social reconstructionism in nineteenth-century Britain". British Journal of Educational Studies'' 61.4 (2013): 417–433.

External links

 
 Finding Aid for the Fabian Society archives, British Library of Political and Economic Science, London School of Economics
 Fabian Society and Young Fabian Collection, British Library of Political and Economic Science, London School of Economics
 Annual Reports 1894–1918
 Fabian Tracts 1893–1990

 
1884 establishments in the United Kingdom
Democratic socialism
Edwardian era
Labour Party (UK) socialist societies
London School of Economics
Organisations based in London
Progressivism in the United Kingdom
Political and economic think tanks based in the United Kingdom
Radicalism (historical)
Social democracy
Socialist organisations in the United Kingdom
Socialist think tanks
Socialist think tanks based in the United Kingdom
Think tanks based in the United Kingdom
Victorian era